Sollicitudo rei socialis (Latin: The Social Concern) is an encyclical promulgated by Pope John Paul II on 30 December 1987, on the twentieth anniversary of Populorum progressio. It deals once more with the theme of development along two fundamental lines:
the failed development of the Third World and 
the meaning of, conditions and requirements for a development of a worthy person. 
The encyclical presents differences between progress and development, and insists that true development cannot be limited to the multiplication of goods and services, but must contribute to the fullness of being a human being. In this way the moral nature of real development is meant to be shown clearly.

External links 
Text of Sollicitudo Rei Socialis

1987 in Christianity
1987 documents
Documents of the Catholic Social Teaching tradition
Papal encyclicals
Documents of Pope John Paul II
December 1987 events